Kohra is a 1993 Hindi mystery thriller.

Plot 
Nisha Rathod (Ayesha Jhulka) joins the same college as Anand Kohli (Armaan Kohli) and despite the ragging and pranks they play on each other initially, they fall in love with each other. During a prank at the college, Nisha gifts Anand a wooden cane while ragging him which later gets exchanged mistakenly with an identical cane that contains smuggled diamonds when Anand bumps into a stranger on a street. The diamonds belong to Sir John.

Sir John, Tinnu (Gulshan Grover) and Peter Gonsalves are dreaded criminals and smugglers whom the Customs teams led by Officer Kailashnath Rathod (Pran) and the police force headed by IG Suryakant (Kiran Kumar) are trying to nab. During their college picnic, Anand's and Nisha's pranks continue and some goons of Tinnu attack Anand and snatch the cane, angering Sir John who arranged for the diamonds.
The next diamond smuggling at the airport is in a baby doll which a stranger Jakarto (Sadashiv Amrapurkar) requests Deepak, a childhood friend of Nisha returning to India, to take care of as he has a crutch and is limping. Customs officials suspect and check Jakarto but Deepak is able to pass customs with the doll without any difficulty. Deepak fails to find Jakarto at the airport as Tinnu's (Gulshan Grover) men nab Jakarto for the diamonds in the doll and gives the doll to Nisha for safekeeping at her home. Tinnu is after the doll and he and Jakarto meet Deepak for the doll who takes them to Nisha's house. But the doll has vanished. Tinnu follows Nisha in search of the doll and tries to capture her. She escapes and hides in a chemical factory. Unable to catch Nisha, Tinnu gets frustrated and shoots randomly at the chemical bottles, spilling a lot of chemicals and gases in the room where Nisha is hiding.

Due to excess inhalation of the chemicals, Nisha loses her eyesight becoming blind. She decides to sacrifice her love because she doesn't want to burden Anand, so she hides her vision problem from him and starts avoiding Anand. Anand becomes a police officer and wants to surprise Nisha about this. But Nisha avoids him and when Anand deliberately visits her, Nisha and Deepak enact a drama of Nisha and Deepak getting married which Anand sees. Anand believes it and starts hating Nisha.

IG Suryakant (Kiran Kumar) hands Anand (Armaan Kohli) the important case of nabbing Sir John and Anand starts investigating. But who is Sir John? And nobody seems to be the person they claim to be. These identities are revealed at the end of a suspenseful thriller.

Cast 
 Armaan Kohli
 Ayesha Jhulka
 Kiran Kumar
 Pran
 Gulshan Grover
 Pradeep Rawat

References 

 

1993 films
1990s Hindi-language films